Halvor Cleophas (June 22, 1842 – April 18, 1937) was an American farmer and politician.

Cleophas was born in Hallingdal, Norway. He emigrated with his parents to the United States and settled in the town of Newark, Rock County, Wisconsin in 1843. Cleophas was a farmer. He served as chairman of the Newark Town Board and was a Republican. He served in the Wisconsin Assembly in 1901 and 1902. Cleophas then moved to Beloit, Wisconsin. In 1917, Cleophas moved to Glendale, California. He died from a heart attack at his daughter's house in Glendale, California.

Notes

External links

1842 births
1937 deaths
Norwegian emigrants to the United States
People from Glendale, California
People from Rock County, Wisconsin
Farmers from Wisconsin
Mayors of places in Wisconsin
Republican Party members of the Wisconsin State Assembly